The Saint Kitts and Nevis women's national football team is the national women's football team of Saint Kitts and Nevis and is overseen by the St. Kitts and Nevis Football Association.

Results and fixtures

The following is a list of match results in the last 12 months, as well as any future matches that have been scheduled.

Legend

2022

Coaching staff

Managerial history
 Earl Jones (2020–2021)
 Jené Baclawski (2021–present)

Players

Current squad
The following players were called-up for the match against the United States Virgin Islands on 12 April 2022.

Caps and goals are updated as of 4 February 2020 after the match against .

Recent call ups

Competitive record

FIFA Women's World Cup 

*Draws include knockout matches decided on penalty kicks.

CONCACAF W Championship record

*Draws include knockout matches decided on penalty kicks.

References

External links
FIFA Team Profile
SKN FA Website

Caribbean women's national association football teams
women